The  is the cultural exchange between the European Union and Japan that is arranged with the help of the , a Japanese organization that since 1992 has worked to create such exchanges between the year's Cultural Capital of Europe and Japan. The "Fest" aims to support both traditional and innovative culture.

The EU–Japan Fest Japan Committee is a non-profit organization financed by European governments, the Agency for Cultural Affairs and other Japanese government institutions, and donations. Its office is in Kōjimachi, Chiyoda, Tokyo.

The program for Patras in 2006 included exhibitions of architecture and photography, and dance and musical performances.

Publications include In-Between, a fourteen-volume set of photographs of Europe by Japanese photographers, and European Eyes on Japan, a seven-volume set of photographs of Japan by European photographers.

See also

Vulcanus in Japan

External links
EU–Japan Fest Japan Committee
The Hosts of the Cultural Capital of Europe 
Program for Patras
In-Between
European Eyes on Japan

Recurring events established in 1992
Contemporary art exhibitions
Japanese contemporary art
European culture
Festivals in Japan
Foreign relations of Japan
Japan in non-Japanese culture
Cultural exchange